Mictopsichia rivadeneirai is a species of moth of the family Tortricidae. It is found in Ecuador.

The wingspan is about 11.5 mm. The ground colour of the forewings is cream mixed with orange and reticulate (net like) brown in the costal and posterior half of the wing. The markings are browner with some orange spots. The hindwings are orange yellow, the apex orange with brown marks.

Etymology
The species is named in honour of Mr. Francisco Rivadeneira.

References

Moths described in 2010
Mictopsichia
Moths of South America
Taxa named by Józef Razowski